The following is a list of Chicago State Cougars men's basketball head coaches. There have been 14 head coaches of the Cougars in their 57-season history.

Chicago State's current head coach is Gerald Gillion. He was hired as the Cougars' head coach in July 2021, replacing Lance Irvin, who was let go after the 2020–21 season.

References

Chicago State

Chicago State Cougars men's basketball coaches